The University of Kalemie (UNIKAL) is a public university located in the city of Kalemie, in Tanganyika Province of the southeastern Democratic Republic of the Congo.

At its creation, it was an Extension of the University of Lubumbashi, then called University Centre of Kalemie (C.U.K.). As of 2012 it had 800 students in 6 faculties. Its president is Kisimba Kya Ngoy. Instruction is in French.

History
The university was created 1 October 2004 as Kalemie Center University(C.U.K.), extension of the  University of Lubumbashi, and became autonomous in 2010 following Ministerial order No. 157/MINESU/CABMIN/EBK/PK/2010 27 September 2010.

Faculties
 Faculty of Agronomy
 Faculty of Law
 Faculty of Medicine
 Faculty of Social, Political and Administrative Sciences
 Faculty of Economics and Management
 Faculty of Public Health

Research centres
 Internet room
 University Library

References
 Ministerial Decree No. 157/MINESU/CABMIN/EBK-PK-2010 September 27, 2010, on the empowerment of some extensions of the institutions of higher and university education (article 2 point 8)

See also
 Kalemie
 Katanga Province

Universities in the Democratic Republic of the Congo
Kalemie
Tanganyika Province
Educational institutions established in 2004
2004 establishments in the Democratic Republic of the Congo